Leiobunum is a genus of the harvestman family Sclerosomatidae with more than 100 described species. Contrary to popular belief, they are not spiders, although they share a resemblance. They are arachnids, in the order Opiliones, harvestmen. Species in Leiobunum tend to have relatively long legs compared with other harvestmen, and some species are gregarious.

Body form
The teguments are soft or subcoriaceous. The striae of the cephalothorax and of the three last abdominal segments are very distinct; those of the anterior segments are scarcely or not at all distinct. The anterior and lateral borders of the cephalothorax are smooth. The eye eminence is relatively small; smooth or, rarely, provided with small, slightly distinct, tubercles; widely separated from the cephalic border. Lateral pores small, oval, and marginal. Anal piece large, transverse-oval or semicircular, much wider than long, and much wider than the reflected borders of the eighth segment. Mandibles short, similar in the two sexes ; first joint furnished at the base below with an acute tooth. Palpi simple ; femur, patella, and tibia without any process and without projecting angles ; maxillary lobe provided at the base with two strong, conical teeth. Maxillary lobe of the second pair of feet very long, nearly straight from the base, not attenuated, directed mesad nearly horizontally, and united on the ventro-meson to the lobe from the opposite side without forming a sensible angle; the two together lightly arched on the cephalic border, and forming an even curve. Sternal piece large, slightly contracted between the fourth pair of coxae, gradually enlarging and obtusely truncate cephalad. The feet are very long and slender; tibia of the second pair with a few false articulations. Palpal claw denticulate. Many Leiobunum species tend to form clusters of several, but some up to 1,000 and more individuals.

Invasive species in Europe

An as yet undescribed species of Leiobunum was first found in the Netherlands in October 2004, although reports date back to at least 2002. Since then, it has been identified from Germany, Switzerland, and Austria. It is distinct from all known Central European species and was probably introduced. This species has a strong tendency to group together, most of the time protected from wind and direct sunlight, and stay in one place for weeks. They swarm out at night to hunt on their own. When disturbed, they move their bodies up and down in a fast, rhythmic motion, with individuals moving away from the disturbance. The first juvenile stages seem to live on the ground below rocks and debris. The largest observed aggregation counted 770 individuals.

Species
 Leiobunum annulipes Banks, 1909 (Costa Rica)
 Leiobunum aldrichi (Weed, 1893) (USA - eastern)
 Leiobunum alvarezi Goodnight & Goodnight, 1945 (Mexico)
 Leiobunum anatolicum Roewer, 1957 (Turkey)
 Leiobunum annulatum Walker, 1930 (USA)
 Leiobunum apenninicum (Martens, 1969) (Italy, France, Austria)
 Leiobunum aurugineum Crosby & Bishop, 1924 (USA - southeastern)
 Leiobunum bicolor  (Wood, 1870) (eastern USA)
 Leiobunum bifrons Roewer, 1957 (Japan)
 Leiobunum bimaculatum Banks, 1893 (USA - California)
 Leiobunum biseriatum Roewer, 1910 (Morocco, Portugal, Spain)
 Leiobunum blackwalli Meade, 1861 (Europe - widespread: Germany, Spain, etc)
 Leiobunum bogerti Goodnight & Goodnight, 1942 (Mexico)
 Leiobunum bolivari Goodnight & Goodnight, 1945 (Mexico)
 Leiobunum bracchiolum C.R.McGhee, 1977 (USA - eastern)
 Leiobunum bruchi Mello-Leitão, 1933  (Mexico)
 Leiobunum brunnea Walker, 1930 (USA)
 Leiobunum calcar  (Wood, 1870) (USA - northeastern)
 Leiobunum caporiacci Roewer, 1957 (Greece)
 Leiobunum coccineum Simon, 1878 (Algeria)
 Leiobunum colimae Goodnight & Goodnight, 1945 (Mexico)
 Leiobunum consimile Banks, 1900 (Mexico)
 Leiobunum crassipalpe Banks, 1909 (Washington)
 Leiobunum cretatum Crosby & Bishop, 1924 (southeastern USA)
 Leiobunum cupreum Simon, 1878 (Morocco, poss. Turkey, Cyprus, Lebanon) 
 Leiobunum curvipalpi Roewer, 1910 (Japan)
 Leiobunum cypricum Roewer, 1957 (Cyprus)
 Leiobunum davisi  (Goodnight & Goodnight, 1942)(Mexico)
 Leiobunum defectivum Rambla, 1959 (Spain)
 Leiobunum denticulatum Banks, 1900 (Mexico)
 Leiobunum depressum Davis, 1934 (USA)
 Leiobunum desertum Goodnight & Goodnight, 1944 (Mexico)
 Leiobunum dromedarium F.O.Pickard-Cambridge, 1904 (Mexico)
 Leiobunum ephippiatum Roewer, 1910 (Oregon)
 Leiobunum escondidum Chamberlin, 1925 (California)
 Leiobunum euserratipalpe Ingianni, McGhee & Shultz, 2011
 Leiobunum exillipes  (Wood, 1878) (California, Nevada)
 Leiobunum flavum Banks, 1894 (Louisiana, Mexico)

 Leiobunum formosum  (Wood, 1870) (northeastern USA)
 Leiobunum fuscum Roewer, 1910 (Guatemala)
 Leiobunum ghigii Caporiacco, 1929 (Italy)
 Leiobunum globosum Suzuki, 1953  (Japan, Russia)
 Leiobunum glabrum L.Koch, 1869 (Tirols)
 Leiobunum gordoni Goodnight & Goodnight, 1945 (Alabama)
 Leiobunum gracile Thorell, 1876
 Leiobunum gruberi Karaman, 1996 (Macedonia)
 Leiobunum guerreoensis Goodnight & Goodnight, 1946 (Mexico)
 Leiobunum hedini Roewer, 1936 (China)
 Leiobunum heinrichi Roewer, 1957 (Burma)
 Leiobunum hiasai Suzuki, 1976 (Japan)
 Leiobunum hikocola Suzuki, 1966  (Japan)
 Leiobunum hiraiwai  (Sato & Suzuki, 1939)
 Leiobunum hiraiwai hiraiwai  (Sato & Suzuki, 1939) (Japan)
 Leiobunum hiraiwai fuji Suzuki, 1976 (Japan)
 Leiobunum hiraiwai izuense Suzuki, 1976 (Japan)
 Leiobunum hiraiwai longum Suzuki, 1976 (Japan)
 Leiobunum hiraiwai shiranense Suzuki, 1976 (Japan) 
 Leiobunum hoffmani Ingianni, McGhee and Shultz, 2011 (USA)
 Leiobunum holtae McGhee, 1977 (USA)
 Leiobunum hongkongium Roewer, 1957 (China)
 Leiobunum hoogstraali Goodnight & Goodnight, 1942 (Mexico)
 Leiobunum knighti Goodnight & Goodnight, 1942 (Mexico)
 † Leiobunum inclusum Roewer, 1939  (fossil: Baltic amber)
 Leiobunum insignitum Roewer, 1910 (Mexico)
 Leiobunum insulare Roewer, 1957 (Greece)
 Leiobunum ischionotatum  (Dugès, 1884) 
 Leiobunum ischionotatum ischionotatum  (Dugès, 1884)  (Mexico)
 Leiobunum ischionotatum luteovittatum Roewer, 1912 (Mexico)
 Leiobunum japanense  (Müller, 1914) 
 Leiobunum japanense japanense  (Müller, 1914) (Japan)
 Leiobunum japanense japonicum  (Suzuki, 1940) (Japan, Korea, Taiwan)
 Leiobunum japanense uenoi Suzuki, 1964 (Japan)
 Leiobunum japonicum  (Müller, 1914) (Japan)
 Leiobunum kohyai Suzuki, 1953 (Japan)
 Leiobunum leiopenis Davis, 1934 (USA - Oklahoma, Kentucky)
 Leiobunum limbatum L.Koch, 1861 (Europe - Alps)
 Leiobunum lindbergi Roewer, 1959
 Leiobunum longipes Weed, 1890 
 Leiobunum longipes longipes Weed, 1890  (USA - northern)
 Leiobunum longipes aldrichi Weed, 1893 (USA - northern)
 Leiobunum lusitanicum Roewer, 1923 (Portugal)
 Leiobunum maculosus (Wood, 1868)
 Leiobunum manubriatum  (Karsch, 1881) (Japan)
 Leiobunum marmoratum F.O.Pickard-Cambridge, 1904 (Mexico)
 Leiobunum maximum Roewer, 1910 
 Leiobunum maximum distinctum Suzuki, 1973 (Japan)
 Leiobunum maximum formosum Suzuki, 1976 (Taiwan)
 Leiobunum maximum maximum Roewer, 1910 (China, Japan, Taiwan)
 Leiobunum maximum yushan Suzuki, 1976 (Taiwan)
 Leiobunum mesopunctatum Goodnight & Goodnight, 1942 (Mexico)
 Leiobunum metallicum Roewer, 1932 (Mexico)
 Leiobunum mexicanum Banks, 1898 (Mexico)
 Leiobunum montanum Suzuki, 1953
 Leiobunum montanum montanum Suzuki, 1953 (Japan)
 Leiobunum montanum sobosanum Suzuki, 1976 (Japan)
 Leiobunum nigrigenum Goodnight & Goodnight, 1945 (Mexico)
 Leiobunum nigripes Weed, 1887
 Leiobunum nigripalpe  (Simon, 1879) (France)
 Leiobunum nigropalpi  (Wood, 1870) (northeastern USA)
 Leiobunum nycticorpum Goodnight & Goodnight, 1942 (Mexico)
 Leiobunum oharai N. Tsurusaki, 1991 (Taiwan)
 Leiobunum oregonense C.J. Goodnight and M.L. Goodnight, 1943
 Leiobunum patzquarum Goodnight & Goodnight, 1942 (Mexico)
 Leiobunum peninsulare Davis, 1934 (USA)
 Leiobunum politum Weed, 1890 (eastern USA)
 Leiobunum politum politum Weed, 1890 
 Leiobunum politum magnum Weed, 1893 (USA - Mississippi)
 Leiobunum potanini  (Schenkel, 1963) (China)
 Leiobunum potosum Goodnight & Goodnight, 1942 (Mexico)
 Leiobunum relictum Davis, 1934 (USA - Oklahoma)
 Leiobunum religiosum  (Simon, 1879) (France)
 Leiobunum roseum C.L.Koch, in Hahn & C.L.Koch 1848 (Tirols)
 Leiobunum rotundum  (Latreille, 1798) (Europe, North Africa, Canary Islands)
 Leiobunum royali Goodnight & Goodnight, 1946 (Mexico)
 Leiobunum rubrum Suzuki, 1966 (Korea, Japan)
 Leiobunum rumelicum Silhavý, 1965 (Bulgaria)
 Leiobunum rupestre  (Herbst, 1799) (central Europe)
 Leiobunum sadoense N. Tsurusaki, 1982 (Japan)
 † Leiobunum sarapum Menge, 1854 (fossil)
 Leiobunum seriatum Simon, 1878 (Asia Minor)
[see also Leiobunum albigenium Sorensen, 1911 (Syria)]
 Leiobunum seriepunctatum Doleschall, 1852
 Leiobunum serratipalpe Roewer, 1910
 Leiobunum silum Shultz, 2018
 Leiobunum simplum Suzuki, 1976
 Leiobunum socialissium C.L.Koch, 1873 (Morocco)
 Leiobunum soproniense Szalay, 1951
 Leiobunum speciosum Banks, 1900 (Alabama)
 Leiobunum subalpinum Komposch, 1998
 Leiobunum supracheliceralis Roewer, 1957
 Leiobunum tamanum Suzuki, 1958
 Leiobunum tascum Goodnight & Goodnight, 1945 (Mexico)
 Leiobunum tisciae Avram, 1968
 Leiobunum tohokuense Suzuki, 1976
 Leiobunum townsendi Weed, 1893 (USA - Texas, Arizona)
 Leiobunum trimaculatum Goodnight & Goodnight, 1943 (USA - Florida)
 Leiobunum tsushimense Suzuki, 1976
 Leiobunum uxorium (Crosby & Bishop, 1924) (USA - southeastern)
 Leiobunum ventricosum  (Wood, 1870) (USA - northeastern)
 Leiobunum ventricosum ventricosum  (Wood, 1870)
 Leiobunum ventricosum hiemale  (Weed, 1890) (USA - southeastern)
 Leiobunum ventricosum floridanum Davis, 1934 (Florida)
 Leiobunum veracruzensis Goodnight & Goodnight, 1947
 Leiobunum viridorsum Goodnight & Goodnight, 1942 (Mexico)
 Leiobunum verrucosum  (Wood, 1870) (New York)
 Leiobunum vittatum  (Say, 1821) (central USA)
 Leiobunum vittatum vittatum  (Say, 1821) 
 Leiobunum vittatum dorsatum Say, 1821 (USA -northern)
 Leiobunum vittatum minor Weed, 1892 (USA - South Dakota)
 Leiobunum wegneri Silhavý, 1976
 Leiobunum zimmermani Roewer, 1952

References

 's Biology Catalog: Sclerosomatidae
  (2007): An unidentified harvestman Leiobunum sp. alarmingly invading Europe (Arachnida: Opiliones). Arachnol. Mitt. 34: 27-38. PDF

Harvestmen
Arachnids of North America
Harvestman genera